The 1984 Indian general election polls in Tamil Nadu were held for 39 seats in the state. The result was a landslide victory for Indian National Congress and its ally All India Anna Dravida Munnetra Kazhagam, winning 37 out of 39 seats. The other 2 seats were won by the opposition, Dravida Munnetra Kazhagam. This marks the start of the dominance of INC-AIADMK, for the next decade winning 38 seats in 1989 election and all 39 seats in 1991 election. The allocation of seats were done what was later dubbed, "The M.G.R formula". Where the regional party would contest 70% of the assembly seats and the national party would be given 70% of the Lok Sabha seats.

Voting and results

Results by Alliance

 The seats from 1980 election, represents the seats of the coalition in this election, and the seats represented from Congress is from the Indira faction.

List of Elected MPs

Post-election Union Council of Ministers from Tamil Nadu

Ministers of State (Deputy Minister)

See also 
Elections in Tamil Nadu

Bibliography 
Volume I, 1984 Indian general election, 8th Lok Sabha

External links
 Website of Election Commission of India
 CNN-IBN Lok Sabha Election History

1984 Indian general election
Indian general elections in Tamil Nadu
1980s in Tamil Nadu